Classical World is a quarterly peer-reviewed academic journal published by Johns Hopkins University Press on behalf of the Classical Association of the Atlantic States. The journal focuses on scholarly works pertaining to Greek and Roman literature, history, traditions, as well as the history of classical scholarship. The editors-in-chief are Robin Mitchell-Boyask (Temple University) and Lee T. Pearcy (Bryn Mawr College)

In 1978, The Classical World published five books compilating past bibliographical articles which had appeared in past volumes. These books were on: Greek drama and poetry; Greek and Roman history; philosophy, religion, and rhetoric; Vergil; and Roman drama and poetry and ancient fiction. The Classical World had published many such review articles.

Abstracting and indexing 
This journal is abstracted and indexed in:
 Arts and Humanities Citation Index
 Current Contents/Arts and Humanities
 EBSCO databases
 International Bibliography of Periodical Literature
 International Bibliography of Book Reviews of Scholarly Literature and Social Sciences
 MLA International Bibliography
 Scopus

References

Further reading

External links 
 

Johns Hopkins University Press academic journals
Classics journals
Publications established in 1907
English-language journals
Quarterly journals